The Agra Canal is an important Indian irrigation work which starts from Okhla in Delhi. The Agra canal originates at the Okhla barrage, downstream of Nizamuddin bridge. 

The weir across the Yamuna was constructed of locally quarried stone.

Navigable branches connect the canal with Mathura and Agra.

History
The canal opened in the year 1874. In the beginning, it was available for navigation, in Delhi, erstwhile Gurgaon, Mathura and Agra Districts, and Bharatpur State. Later, navigation was stopped in 1904 and the canal has, since then, been exclusively used for irrigation purposes only. At present, the canal does not flow in Gurgaon district, but only in Faridabad, which was earlier a part of Gurgaon.

In recent times, Agra canal is an important landmark which separates Greater Faridabad from Faridabad.

References

The Agra Canal also has many places to visit along its coast.

Canals in Uttar Pradesh
Agra district
Yamuna River
Buildings and structures in Delhi
Canals in Rajasthan
Canals opened in 1874
Canals in Haryana